Baputa is a genus of moths of the family Noctuidae.

Species
Baputa dichroa Kirsch, 1877
Baputa dimidiata Walker, 1865

References
Natural History Museum Lepidoptera genus database

Calpinae